Soviet troops may refer to:

 Red Army, of the Russian SFSR then the Soviet Union from 1918 to 1946
 Soviet Army, of the Soviet Union from 1946 to 1991 (then the Commonwealth of Independent States until 1992)